Eupithecia ornea  is a moth in the family Geometridae first described by Herbert Druce in 1893. It is found in Panama.

The forewings and hindwings are pale brownish fawn, each crossed by indistinct pale lines.

References

Moths described in 1893
ornea
Moths of Central America